Need Me may refer to

 "Need Me", a song by Eminem and Pink from the album Revival, 2017
 "Need Me", a 1957 song by Jimmy Newman
 "Need Me", a 2019 song by J.I the Prince of N.Y
 "Needed Me", a 2016 song by Rihanna

See also
 Need You (disambiguation)